Katembe, also Catembe is an urban center in Mozambique. Located on the Maputo Bay, it is a suburb of Maputo, the national capital. The name also applies to the administrative district, of which the town is the headquarters.

Location

Katembe is located on the south-western side of Maputo Bay, near the Estuário do Espírito Santo where the rivers Tembe, Mbuluzi, Matola and Infulene converge. At the extreme east of Katembe and the bay is the island of Inhaca.

It is connected to the rest of Maputo by the Maputo-Katembe Bridge, a  infrastructure development, constructed between June 6, 2014 and 10 November 2018. The bridge cost US$785 million to construct, 90 percent funded by a loan from the Export-Import Bank of China, with the Mozambican government founding the remaining 10 percent.

Administrative subdivisions

Maputo (of which Katembe is a component), is divided into seven main administrative divisions. Each of these consists of several smaller city quarters or bairros. Katembe is an urban district and is a component of the city of Maputo. Its administrative divisions include Gwachene, Chale, Inguice, Xamissava, and Inkassane.

Population
In 2018, the population of Katembe urban district was estimated at approximately 25,000 people, mainly of the Tembe ethnic lineage, who are closely related to the Swazi royal lineage and the Tsonga people of Maputaland, in South Africa.

Transport
Maputo-Katembe Bridge

The iconic twin-tower bridge and connecting roads was constructed by the China Road and Bridge Corporation. It is the longest suspension bridge on the African continent. Over 20,000 jobs, both full-time and part-time, were created during its construction. As of May 2018, 3,788 Mozambicans were still employed along with 467 Chinese nationals.

Ferries
Ferry boats departing from Maputo to the district of Katembe are available during the week. A ferry can carry approximately 20 vehicles per trip. Some ferries are privately owned, while others are government-owned.

See also

Delagoa Bay
List of cities in Mozambique by population
Metropolitan Maputo

References

External links
Mozambique anticipates landmark Chinese-built suspension bridge set for launch in June As of 14 May 2014.

Populated coastal places in Mozambique
Populated places in Mozambique
 
Port cities in Africa
Port cities and towns of the Indian Ocean